The Point is a thrice-yearly literary magazine established in autumn 2008 by editors Jon Baskin, Jonny Thakkar, and Etay Zwick, then doctoral students at the University of Chicago's Committee on Social Thought. The magazine, based in Chicago, publishes essays in literature, culture, critical theory, politics, and the arts, as well as original art; its contributors are principally academics, although it is not an academic journal. The Point was founded as a forum in which ideas of philosophical significance could be discussed “as active forces in our lives and cultures.” It was intended as a remedy to what its editors perceived as shortcomings in the intellectual climate, particularly to the deficit of “seriousness” in the content of popular magazines for an educated audience such as The Atlantic.

Its issues typically feature a symposium around which a number of essays are organized. The symposium is structured around a central question; past symposia have included, among others, the questions What is science for? and What are animals for?. The magazine's editorial perspective strives to bridge scholarly writing and popular accessibility by preserving an attitude of intellectual rigor without abstruseness or academic jargon. The Point, according to its statement of purpose, “is for anybody who is frustrated with the intellectual poverty of the majority of today's journalism and public discourse.”

In the wake of the departure of numerous long-time editors at The New Republic, The Point established a campaign to position itself as a “home for strenuous cultural and literary criticism.”

Contributors
Notable contributors:
Bill Ayers
Thomas Chatterton Williams
Lorraine Daston
Raymond Geuss
Yuval Levin
Martha Nussbaum
Robert Pippin
Steven Poole
Lucy Sante
Erik Olin Wright
Slavoj Žižek
Agnes Callard

See also
List of literary magazines
Jacobin (magazine)
The Baffler
n+1
The New Republic
The New Inquiry
The Boston Review
Oxford American
Guernica

Footnotes

2008 establishments in Illinois
Committee on Social Thought
Literary magazines published in the United States
Magazines established in 2008
Magazines published in Chicago
Triannual magazines published in the United States